The Vaigai Dam  is built across the Vaigai River near Andipatti, in the Theni district of Tamil Nadu, southern India. Near the dam, the Government of Tamil Nadu has constructed an Agricultural Research Station for researching the growing of  a variety of crops, including rice, sorghum, blackgram, cowpea and cotton.

History

Vaigai Dam was inaugurated on 21 January 1959 by Tamil Nadu chief Minister K. Kamaraj. It One of the few dams which is not constructed in between two mountains so this dam completely depends on its own concrete strength. This dam is the life line of farmers of the five districts namely Theni, Dindigul, Madurai, Sivagangai and Ramanathapuram.

Capacity
Vaigai Dam measures 111 ft in height and can store water up to 71 ft, with a total storage capacity of 6,143 mcft.

Maintenance

Vaigai Dam is maintained by Water Resources Department which in turn managed by the Tamil Nadu Public Works Department.

The dam is illuminated every Sunday as it is one of the premier picnic destinations in the region.

A significant improvement needed on the important spot of the park required on the elephant slide and painting the map model in the children park will definitely attract more visitors.

Vaigai Dam Park

A Small and beautiful park is maintained by the Water Resources Department on both sides of the Dam. A small bridge connects the two sides of the park in front of the dam. The park also have a children play area.

A mini train which takes the visitors a small round around the park till date was good to see.

A new addition is the pedal boating nearby the train was good. Everyone can enjoy it.

Vaigai Dam Hydroelectric Power Plant

Vaigai Hydroelectric Power Plant was design capacity of 6 MW. It has 2 unit(s) of 3 MW each. The first unit was commissioned in 1990. It is operated by Tamil Nadu Generation and Distribution Corporation Limited (TANGEDCO).

Upcoming developments

Vaigai Dam is one of the 104 dams in Tamil Nadu that is proposed to be improved under the Dam Rehabilitation and Improvement Project ( DRIP).

Transportation

By Road:The dam is situated at 9 km from Andipatti, 14 km from Theni and 70 km from Madurai.

By Train:The nearest railway station is Andipatti Railway station which is located 10 km away from the dam.

By Air:The nearest airport is Madurai Airport(IXM) which is 80 km away from the Dam. Air connectivity is available from Chennai, Mumbai, Delhi, Hyderabad, and Vijayawada. International connectivity is available to Colombo, Dubai and Singapore.

Gallery

References

External links

Dam Break Analysis for Vaigai Dam
Vaigai Dam

Hydroelectric power stations in Tamil Nadu
Dams completed in 1959
Dams in Tamil Nadu
Theni district
1959 establishments in Madras State
20th-century architecture in India